Romanization of Korean refers to systems for representing the Korean language in the Latin script. Korea's alphabetic script, called Hangul, has historically been used in conjunction with Hanja (Chinese characters), though such practice has become infrequent.

Romaja literally means Roman letters in Korean, and refers to the Latin script.  "Romaja" is not to be confused with "romanization".  The former can be applied to any use of the Latin script in Korean text—whether for Korean or non-Korean words or names—while the latter refers to writing Korean words using the Latin script: either romanizing individual words in a Korean text, or writing an entire Korean text in the Latin script.

Systems
Many romanization schemes are in common use:
 Revised Romanization of Korean (RR, also called South Korean or Ministry of Culture (MC) 2000): This is the most commonly used and widely accepted system of romanization for Korean. It includes rules both for transcription and for transliteration.  South Korea now officially uses this system which was approved in 2000. Road signs and textbooks were required to follow these rules as soon as possible, at a cost estimated by the government to be at least US$500–600 million. Almost all road signs, names of railway and subway stations on line maps and signs etc. have been changed. Romanization of surnames and existing companies' names (e.g. Hyundai) has been left untouched; the government encourages using the new system for given names and new companies.
 RR is similar to MR, but uses neither diacritics nor apostrophes, which has helped it to gain widespread acceptance on the Internet. In cases of ambiguity, orthographic syllable boundaries may be indicated with a hyphen, although state institutions never seemed to make use of this option until recently.  Hyphenation on street and address signs is used to separate proper names and numbers from their assigned function.  As of 2014, under mandate from the Roadname Address Act, Korea Post officially changed the older address system from lot-based district subdivisions to a street-based system that regularly utilizes hyphenation in order to disambiguate.  The Ministry of the Interior also provided the public with various service announcements and websites forewarning of the change toward a clear and complete signage system classifying all streets and individual addresses with romanization (of which hyphenation is a systematic part).
 McCune–Reischauer (MR; 1937?): the first transcription to gain some acceptance. A slightly modified version of MR was the official system for Korean in South Korea from 1984 to 2000, and yet a different modification is still the official system in North Korea.  MR uses breves, apostrophes and diereses, the latter two indicating orthographic syllable boundaries in cases that would otherwise be ambiguous.
 Several variants of MR, often also called "McCune's and Reischauer's", differ from the original mostly in whether word endings are separated from the stem by a space, by a hyphen or not at all; and if a hyphen or space is used, whether sound change is reflected in a stem's last and an ending's first consonant letter (e.g. pur-i vs. pul-i). Although mostly irrelevant when transcribing uninflected words, these variants are so widespread that any mention of "McCune–Reischauer romanization" may not necessarily refer to the original system as published in the 1930s. MR-based romanizations have been common in popular literature until 2000.
 The ALA-LC / U.S. Library of Congress system is based on but deviates from MR. Unlike in MR, it addresses word division in seven pages of detail. Syllables of given names are always separated with a hyphen, which is expressly never done by MR. Sound changes are ignored more often than in MR. ALA-LC also distinguishes between ‘ and ’.
 Yale (1942):  This system has become the established standard romanization for Korean among linguists. Vowel length in old or dialectal pronunciation is indicated by a macron.  In cases that would otherwise be ambiguous, orthographic syllable boundaries are indicated with a period.  This system also indicates consonants that have disappeared from a word's South Korean orthography and standard pronunciation.
 ISO/TR 11941 (1996): This actually is two different standards under one name: one for North Korea (DPRK) and the other for South Korea (ROK).  The initial submission to the ISO was based heavily on Yale and was a joint effort between both states, but they could not agree on the final draft.  A superficial comparison between the two is available here: 
 Lukoff romanization, developed 1945–47 for Fred Lukoff’s Spoken Korean coursebooks
 Romanization of Korean (1992): the official romanization in North Korea.

McCune–Reischauer-based transcriptions and the Revised Romanization differ from each other mainly in the choice of how to represent certain hangul letters. Both attempt to match a word's spelling to how it would be written if it were an English word, so that an English speaker would come as close as possible to its Korean pronunciation by pronouncing it naturally.  Hence, the same hangul letter may be represented by different Roman letters, depending on its pronunciation in context.  The Yale system, on the other hand, represents each Korean letter by always the same Roman letter(s) context-independently, thus not indicating the hangul letters' context-specific pronunciation.

Even in texts that claim to follow one of the above, aberrations are a common occurrence and a major obstacle, e.g. when conducting an automated search on the Internet, as the searcher must check all possible spelling variants, a considerable list even without such aberrations.

In addition to these systems, many people spell names or other words in an ad hoc manner, producing more variations (e.g. 이/리 (李), which is variously romanized as Lee, Yi, I, or Rhee).  For more details, see Wikipedia:Naming conventions (Korean).

SKATS is a transliteration system that does not attempt to use letters of a similar function in Western languages. A similar approach is to transliterate by hitting the keys that would produce a Korean word on a keyboard with Dubeolsik layout (e.g. 위키백과 → dnlzlqorrhk). This can often be seen on the internet, for example in usernames.

Notes:

Examples

As a new writing system for Korean
In the 1920s-1930s various languages of the Soviet Union were switched to the Latin alphabet and it was planned that the language of Koreans of the Far East would be one of them. Hanja was deemed too hard to learn, while Hangul was claimed to be inconvenient for typesetting and handwriting. Since removing of Hanja would result in much ambiguity, it was proposed that Chinese words would be replaced by words of Korean origin (compare linguistic purism in Korean).
a ʙ d e æ g h i y k kh l r m n ng o ө ə p ph s t th u z

Lowecase ʙ was commonly used in Soviet Roman-derived alphabets due to some alphabets having a letter similar to b with a different purpose. The usage of only lowercase letters was also not unusual, as it was the Latin alphabet of Adyghe language, for example.

Some words written in the Soviet Latin alphabet: gu lli, nongdhion haggio, nong ʙ, zængsan, gugga diaʙondiyi.

The alphabet saw criticism from Koreans and was never put into use.

See also
Cyrillization of Korean
McCune-Reischauer
Yale Romanization of Korean
Revised Romanization

References

External links
 Comparison tables of the different systems:
 Comparison table of ISO TR/11941, North Korean national system (1992), Revised Romanization, McCune–Reischauer, Yale (PDF file from UN Group of Experts on Geographical Names Working Group on Romanization Systems)
 Comparison table of IPA, Yale, McCune–Reischauer, Lukoff, South Korea Ministry of Education, Joseon Gwahagwon, Revised Romanization (PDF file from Glossika Inc.)
 Lukoff's system (simple table)
 Gangmun Romanization
 Online Roman to Korean transliteration
 Another online Roman to Korean transliteration